Giovanni "Gianni" Merlo (born 16 April 1947) is an Italian sports journalist, reporter at La Gazzetta dello Sport and a president of International Sports Press Association, AIPS [Italian].

Honor 
 IAAF award in the nomination of the best sports journalist in 2013.

Bibliography

References 

Italian sports journalists
Italian sportswriters
1947 births
Living people